Charles Edward Randall (1884 – 27 September 1916) was an English professional footballer who played in the Football League for Woolwich Arsenal and Newcastle United as an inside left.

Personal life 
Randall was married and had one son, who died in infancy. In March 1915, during the second year of the First World War, Randall enlisted as a private in the Coldstream Guards. He arrived on the Western Front in November 1915 and was killed on the Somme on 27 September 1916. He was buried in Dantzig Alley British Cemetery near Mametz.

Career statistics

References

1884 births
1916 deaths
People from Bearpark
Footballers from County Durham
English footballers
Association football inside forwards
Newcastle United F.C. players
Huddersfield Town A.F.C. players
Military personnel from County Durham
Castleford Town F.C. players
Arsenal F.C. players
North Shields F.C. players
Midland Football League players
English Football League players
British Army personnel of World War I
Coldstream Guards soldiers
British military personnel killed in the Battle of the Somme
Burials at Dantzig Alley British Cemetery